Elaine Lee is a former association football player who represented New Zealand at international level.

Lee made a single appearance for Football Ferns in their first ever international coming on as a substitute to score New Zealand's second goal as they beat Hong Kong 2–0 on 25 August 1975 at the inaugural AFC Women's Asian Cup.

Honours

New Zealand
AFC Women's Championship: 1975

References

Year of birth missing (living people)
Living people
New Zealand women's association footballers
New Zealand women's international footballers
Women's association footballers not categorized by position